Yebyu Township is a township of Dawei District in the Taninthayi Division of Myanmar. The principal town is Yebyu. The eastern portion of the township includes Kaleinaung Subtownship, an unofficial division used by the Township for statistical and administrative ease.

References 

Townships of Taninthayi Region